Union of Authors and Performers, or rather Zväz autorov a interprétov populárnej hudby (ZAI), is a Slovak not-for-profit trade organization that works to increase brand recognition of the local music scene and its artists. Headquartered in Bratislava, the union was co-founded by Martin Sarvaš, and it is best known for holding the annual ZAI Awards in the country.

History
The origin of the organization dates back to the 1990s, when it produced samplers for new local artists to promote their work on a national level. Apart from that, the association published the Music Report magazine in the region, as well held a music festival called Non Stop Rock Show.

ZAI Awards

References

External links
 ZAI (Official site)

Union of Authors and Performers
Music industry associations
Organizations established in 1990
Music organisations based in Slovakia